In the Night may refer to:

Music
In the Night Tour, a concert tour by Kelly Key
In the Night, a video by Mustasch, 2008

Albums
In the Night (Cheryl Lynn album) or the title song, 1981
In the Night (Dream Evil album) or the title song, 2010
In the Night (George Shearing and Dakota Staton album), 1958

Songs
"In the Night" (song), by the Weeknd, 2015
"In the Night" (Pet Shop Boys song), 1985
"In the Night", by Capital Sound, 1994
"In the Night", by Blackfoot from Tomcattin', 1980
"In the Night", by Rock Goddess from Hell Hath No Fury, 1983
"In the Night", by Phinehas from The Fire Itself, 2021
"In the Night", composed by Norman Mapp

Other uses
In the Night (ballet), a 1970 ballet by Jerome Robbins to nocturnes of Frédéric Chopin
In the Night (film), a 1922 British-Dutch silent film directed by Frank Richardson

See also
Dans la Nuit (disambiguation)
In the Night Garden..., a British children's television series 2007–2009
In the Night Kitchen, a 1970 children's book by Maurice Sendak
The Orphan's Tales: In the Night Garden, a 2006 novel by Catherynne M. Valente
Strangers in the Night (disambiguation)